The Mindanao lorikeet or Mount Apo lorikeet (Saudareos johnstoniae) is a species of parrot in the family Psittaculidae. There are two very similar subspecies, which are both endemic to Mindanao, Philippines.

Its natural habitat is subtropical or tropical moist montane forests.
It is threatened by habitat loss and trapping for the illegal wildlife trade. IUCN estimates the population to be as low as 1,500 individuals with it going locally extinct in areas of its range.

Taxonomy
The Mindanao lorikeet was formerly placed in the genus Trichoglossus but was moved to a newly introduced genus Saudareos based on the results of a molecular genetic analysis of the lorikeets published in 2020.

There are two poorly differentiated subspecies:
S. j. johnstoniae – central and southeast Mindanao
S. j. pistra – western Mindanao

Description
The Mindanao lorikeet is 20 cm (8 in) long. Its green and has a beautiful color on the front. Its face is red, and it has a dark purple band on the head. It has many beautiful parts under the wing. Its feet are gray. Its beak is orange, the area around its eyes is dark gray, and its iris is red. Males and females are the same in appearance. The young have less red on the face and instead of the purple band they have brown on the back of the eye, gray around their eyes, brown on their iris, and dark brown on their beak. They eat small insects such as fireflies and spiders.

References

Cited Texts

External links
Oriental Bird Images: Mindanao Lorikeet  Selected photos

Mindanao lorikeet
Birds of Mindanao
Mindanao lorikeet
Taxonomy articles created by Polbot
Taxobox binomials not recognized by IUCN